The 1906–07 FA Cup was the 36th season of the world's oldest association football competition, the Football Association Challenge Cup (more usually known as the FA Cup). The Wednesday won the competition for the second time, beating holders Everton 2–1 in the final at Crystal Palace.

Matches were scheduled to be played at the stadium of the team named first on the date specified for each round, which was always a Saturday. If scores were level after 90 minutes had been played, a replay would take place at the stadium of the second-named team later the same week. If the replayed match was drawn further replays would be held at neutral venues until a winner was determined. If scores were level after 90 minutes had been played in a replay, a 30-minute period of extra time would be played.

Calendar
The format of the FA Cup for the season had a preliminary round, five qualifying rounds, and six proper rounds, including the semi-finals and final.

First Round Proper
36 of the 40 clubs from the First and Second divisions joined the 12 clubs who came through the qualifying rounds. Of the League sides not given byes to this round, Burslem Port Vale, Glossop and Burton United were put into the fifth qualifying round, and each one won. Clapton Orient were placed in the preliminary round, but their opponents, Grays United, were given a walkover. Nine non-league clubs joined the three League sides in winning through to the first round proper.

Sixteen non-league sides were given byes to the First Round to bring the total number of teams up to 64. These were:

32 matches were scheduled to be played on 12 January 1907. Thirteen matches were drawn and went to replays in the following midweek fixture, of which four went to a second replay the following week.

Second Round Proper
The 16 second round matches were played on 2 February 1907. Five matches were drawn, with the replays taking place in the following midweek fixture. One of these, the match between Blackburn Rovers and Tottenham Hotspur, went to a second replay the following week.

Third Round Proper
The eight Third Round matches were scheduled for 23 February 1907. There were three replays, played in the following midweek fixture.

Fourth Round Proper
The four Fourth Round matches were scheduled for 9 March 1907. The Crystal Palace – Everton game was drawn, and replayed on 13 March.

Semi-finals

The semi-final matches were played on 23 March 1907. The Wednesday and Everton won to meet in the final.

Final

The Final was contested by The Wednesday and Everton at Crystal Palace. Sheffield Wednesday won 2–1, with goals by Jimmy Stewart and George Simpson.

See also
FA Cup Final Results 1872-

References
General
Official site; fixtures and results service at TheFA.com
1906-07 FA Cup at rsssf.com
1906-07 FA Cup at soccerbase.com

Specific

 
FA Cup seasons
England
Cup